The following is a list of mayors of Miami-Dade County, Florida.

Mayors

See also
 List of mayors of Miami (city)
 Government of Miami-Dade County

References

Mayors
Miami-Dade County
Miami-related lists